Congo at the Olympics may refer to:

Republic of the Congo at the Olympics
Democratic Republic of the Congo at the Olympics